Patience Akyianu is a Ghanaian Banker and a former managing director of Barclays Bank Ghana.

Education 
Patience Akyianu completed her Secondary School education at Wesley Girls' Senior High School in Cape Coast, the capital of the Central Region (Ghana). She Later graduated from the University of Ghana Business school with first class honors in Business Administration (accounting option). She also holds an MBA (Finance option) from the same institution.

Career 
Patience Akyianu started her banking journey at Standard chartered bank as a financial controller. She rose to the position of Chief Financial Officer (CFO) in the South African office of the Standard chartered bank Africa regional operations.

Awards and nominations
Patience Akyianu was awarded the finance CEO of the year at the 3rd Ghana CFO awards in 2017.
She was also nominated among the 60 women rising in Africa in 2017.
Patience Akyianu was also nominated at the 2018 GECE Awards.
Nobles International Award (2013), Africa Female Economic Champion-Banking (Centre for Economic & Leadership Development (CELD)-2014), she was inducted into Global Women Leaders Hall of Fame (CELD- 2014) and Woman of Excellence in Finance (Ghana CFO Awards 2015). Nominee in the Top 50 Rising Stars in Africa (The Africa Report, May 2014)
2021 she was African Female Business Leader of the Year

References

Ghanaian bankers
Living people
Year of birth missing (living people)